Aquilonia is a town and comune in the province of Avellino, part of the Campania region of southern Italy.

History
The Lombards called the town Carbonara or Carunar, supposedly because a major local occupation was charcoal making. In 1861, after the unification of Italy, the town was renamed Aquilonia based on a 16th-century assumption that this was the site of the Battle of Aquilonia between the Rome and the Samnites.

On 23 July 1930 a major earthquake destroyed the town, and it was rebuilt at a higher location nearby.

Geography
Located in the eastern side of the province, close to Basilicata, Aquilonia borders with the municipalities of Bisaccia, Calitri, Lacedonia, Melfi, Monteverde and Rionero in Vulture.

Twin towns — sister cities
Aquilonia is twinned with:

  Cambiano, Italy 
  Caramagna Piemonte, Italy

References

External links

 Aquilonia official website
Aquilonia info website

Roman sites of Campania
Cities and towns in Campania
Former populated places in Italy